Proteseia is a genus of picture-winged flies in the family Ulidiidae.

Species
Proteseia steyskali  Korneyev & Hernandes, 1998

Distribution
Mexico.

References

Ulidiidae
Brachycera genera
Diptera of North America
Endemic insects of Mexico
Monotypic Brachycera genera